At the 1964 Summer Olympics, eighteen swimming events were contested, ten for men and eight for women.  There were a total of 405 participants from 42 countries competing.  For the first time, the 4×100 metres freestyle relay for men and the 400 metres individual medley for both men and women were contested. Olympic records were broken in all events and the world record was broken in ten events. This competition also marked the debut of electronic touchpads for timing.

15-year-old Sharon Stouder won four medals, three of them gold.

Events

Participating nations 
405 swimmers from 42 nations competed.

Medal table

Medal summary

Men's events

Women's events

Gallery of the medalists 
Some of the Olympic medalists in Tokyo:

References

 
1964
1964 Summer Olympics events
1964 in swimming